The gastric mucosa is the mucous membrane layer of the stomach, which contains the glands and the gastric pits. In humans, it is about 1 mm thick, and its surface is smooth, soft, and velvety. It consists of simple columnar epithelium, lamina propria, and the muscularis mucosae.

Description
In its fresh state, it is of a pinkish tinge at the pyloric end and of a red or reddish-brown color over the rest of its surface. In infancy it is of a brighter hue, the vascular redness being more marked.

It is thin at the cardiac extremity, but thicker toward the pylorus. During the contracted state of the organ it is thrown into numerous plaits or rugae, which, for the most part, have a longitudinal direction, and are most marked toward the pyloric end of the stomach, and along the greater curvature. These folds are entirely obliterated when the organ becomes distended.

When examined with a lens, the inner surface of the mucous membrane presents a peculiar honeycomb appearance from being covered with funnel-like depressions or foveolae of a polygonal or hexagonal form, which vary from 0.12 to 0.25 mm. in diameter. These are the ducts of the gastric glands, and at the bottom of each may be seen one or more minute orifices, the openings of the gland tubes. Gastric glands are simple or branched tubular glands that emerge on the deeper part of the  gastric foveola, inside the gastric areas and outlined by the folds of the mucosa.

Types of glands
There are three types of glands: cardiac glands (in the proximal part of the stomach), fundic (oxyntic) glands (the dominating type of gland), and pyloric glands.
The cardiac glands mainly contain mucus-producing cells called foveolar cells.
The bottom part of the oxyntic glands is dominated by zymogenic (chief) cells that produce pepsinogen (an inactive precursor of the pepsin enzyme). Parietal cells, which secrete hydrochloric acid (HCl) are scattered in the glands, with most of them in the middle part. The upper part of the glands consist of mucous neck cells; in this part the dividing cells are seen.
The pyloric glands contain mucus-secreting cells.

Several types of endocrine cells are found in throughout the gastric mucosa. The pyloric glands contain gastrin-producing cells (G cells); this hormone stimulates acid production from the parietal cells. Enterochromaffin-like cells (ECLs), found in the oxyntic glands release histamine, which also is a powerful stimulant of the acid secretion.
The A cells produce glucagon, which mobilizes the hepatic glycogen, and the enterochromaffin cells produce serotonin, which stimulates the contraction of the smooth muscles.

Surface
The surface of the mucous membrane is covered by a single layer of columnar epithelium. This epithelium commences very abruptly at the cardiac orifice, where there is a sudden transition from the stratified epithelium of the esophagus. The epithelial lining of the gland ducts is of the same character and is continuous with the general epithelial lining of the stomach. An important iodine concentration by sodium-iodide symporter (NIS) is present in mucinous cells of surface epithelium and gastric pits of the fundus and pyloric part of the stomach.

Pathology 
 Gastritis
 Acute gastritis
 Chronic gastritis
 Gastric tumors

See also

 Enterochromaffin-like cell
 Foveolar cell
 Gastric chief cell
 Parietal cell

References

External links
 
 Diagram at gerd.com
 Histology at ucsd.edu

Abdomen
Anatomy
Digestive system
Membrane biology
Organs (anatomy)
Mucosa